Norman Rigby (23 May 1923 – 21 August 2001) was an English professional football centre half and manager who made over 430 appearances for Peterborough United. Rigby is a member of the club's Hall of Fame and in a Football League 125th anniversary poll was voted by the Peterborough United supporters as the club's fifth best-ever captain. He later managed Peterborough United and in non-league football.

Career statistics

Honours

As a player 
Notts County

 Football League Third Division South: 1949–50
Peterborough United

 Football League Fourth Division: 1960–61
 Midland League: 1955–56, 1956–57, 1957–58, 1958–59, 1959–60

As a manager 
Stamford

 United Counties League Premier Division: 1975–76, 1977–78
 United Counties League Cup: 1975–76

As an individual 
 Peterborough United Hall of Fame

References

1923 births
2001 deaths
English footballers
English Football League players
Ransome & Marles F.C. players
Notts County F.C. players
Peterborough United F.C. players
Boston United F.C. players
Footballers from Nottinghamshire
English football managers
Peterborough United F.C. managers
March Town United F.C. managers
Bourne Town F.C. managers
Stamford A.F.C. managers
English Football League managers
People from Warsop
Newark Town F.C. players
Association football wing halves
Association football fullbacks